Labanda is a genus of moths of the family Nolidae erected by Francis Walker in 1859.

Description
Papi smoothly scaled, where the second joint reaching vertex of head and third joint long and naked. Antennae very long and slender, minutely ciliated in male. Thorax smoothly scaled. Abdomen slender, with dorsal tufts on the first two segments, and usually extending far beyond the hindwings. Tibia almost naked. Forewings with round apex. The outer margin evenly curved. Hindwings with vein 5 from lower angle of cell.

Species
Labanda achine (Felder & Rogenhofer, 1874)
Labanda affinis Hulstaert, 1924
Labanda bryochlora Hampson, 1902 South Africa
Labanda carinata Holloway, 2003 Borneo
Labanda ceylusalis Walker, 1859 Peninsular Malaysia, Borneo, Palawan, Sulawesi
Labanda chloromela (Walker, 1858)
Labanda concinna Holloway, 2003 Borneo
Labanda contrastriatula Holloway, 2003 Borneo, Peninsular Malaysia
Labanda dentilinea (Walker, 1863) Borneo, Peninsular Malaysia
Labanda fasciata (Walker, 1865)
Labanda herbealis Walker, 1859 Sri Lanka, Borneo
Labanda huntei Warren, 1903 Queensland
Labanda keyalis Gaede, 1937
Labanda nebulosa Candèze, 1927
Labanda palliviridis Holloway, 2003 Borneo, Peninsular Malaysia, north-east Himalayas
Labanda quadralis Holloway, 2003 Borneo
Labanda saturalis Walker, [1866] Indo-Australian tropics (India–Solomons)
Labanda semipars (Walker, 1858) Sri Lanka
Labanda striatula Holloway, 2003 Borneo
Labanda submuscosa (Walker, 1865) Java
Labanda umbrosa Hampson, 1912 Myanmar, Peninsular Malaysia, Borneo
Labanda umonea Holloway, 2003 Borneo
Labanda viridalis Swinhoe, 1905
Labanda viridumbrosa Holloway, 2003 Borneo

References

Chloephorinae